11 is the first studio album by the pop singer-songwriter Ua. It was released on October 23, 1996. The album was re-issued on September 22, 2005.

Track listing

Charts, certifications and sales

Release history

References

External links 

1996 debut albums
Ua (singer) albums
Japanese-language albums
Victor Entertainment albums
Albums produced by Shinichi Osawa
Albums produced by Nobukazu Takemura
Albums produced by Yasuhiro Kobayashi